The judge royal, also justiciar, chief justice or Lord Chief Justice, was the second-highest judge, preceded only by the palatine, in the Kingdom of Hungary between around 1127 and 1884. After 1884, the judge royal was only a symbolic function, but it was only in 1918 — with the end of Habsburgs in the Kingdom of Hungary (the kingdom continued formally until 1946) — that the function ceased officially.

There remain significant problems in the translation of the title of this officer. In Latin, the title translates as 'Judge of the Royal Court', which lacks specificity. In Hungarian, he is 'Judge of the Country', with 'country' in this sense meaning 'political community', being thus broadly analogous to the German 'Land'. English has no obvious translation for Landesrichter, which is the direct German translation of országbíró.

List of office-holders

Twelfth century

Thirteenth century

Fourteenth century

Fifteenth century

Sixteenth century

Seventeenth century

Eighteenth century

Nineteenth century

Twentieth century

See also
 Palatine (Kingdom of Hungary)
 Master of the treasury

Footnotes

References

  C. Tóth, Norbert; Horváth, Richárd; Neumann, Tibor; Pálosfalvi, Tamás (2016). Magyarország világi archontológiája, 1458–1526, I. Főpapok és bárók [Secular Archontology of Hungary, 1458–1526, Volume I: Prelates and Barons] (in Hungarian). MTA Bölcsészettudományi Kutatóközpont Történettudományi Intézete. .
  Engel, Pál (1996). Magyarország világi archontológiája, 1301–1457, I. ("Secular Archontology of Hungary, 1301–1457, Volume I"). História, MTA Történettudományi Intézete. Budapest. .
 Engel, Pál (2001). The Realm of St Stephen: A History of Medieval Hungary, 895-1526. I.B. Tauris Publishers. .
  Fallenbüchl, Zoltán (1988). Magyarország főméltóságai ("High Dignitaries in Hungary"). Maecenas Könyvkiadó. .
  Markó, László (2006). A magyar állam főméltóságai Szent Istvántól napjainkig: Életrajzi Lexikon ("Great Officers of State in Hungary from King Saint Stephen to Our Days: A Biographical Encyclopedia"). 2nd edition, Helikon Kiadó. 
 Rady, Martyn (2000). Nobility, Land and Service in Medieval Hungary. Palgrave (in association with School of Slavonic and East European Studies, University College London). .
 Segeš, Vladimír (2002). Entry Chief justice in: Škvarna, Dušan; Bartl, Július; Čičaj, Viliam; Kohútová, Mária; Letz, Róbert; Segeš, Vladimír; Slovak History: Chronology & Lexicon; Bolchazy-Carducci Publishers. Wauconda (Illinois); .
 Stephen Werbőczy: The Customary Law of the Renowned Kingdom of Hungary in Three Parts (1517) (Edited and translated by János M. Bak, Péter Banyó and Martyn Rady with an introductory study by László Péter) (2005). Charles Schlacks, Jr. Publishers. .
  Zsoldos, Attila (2011). Magyarország világi archontológiája, 1000–1301 ("Secular Archontology of Hungary, 1000–1301"). História, MTA Történettudományi Intézete. Budapest. .

Barons of the realm (Kingdom of Hungary)